Indumathi  is a 2009 Indian Telugu-language comedy thriller film directed by Harsha P Reddy and starring Shweta Bhardwaj and Sivaji with Bharath Reddy, Harsha Vardhan, Vennela Kishore, Satyam Rajesh, Vijay Sai and Noel Sean in important roles. The film is inspired by the American film Psycho (1960).

Cast 

Shweta Bhardwaj as Honey
Sivaji as Chandu
Bharath Reddy as Raj
Harsha Vardhan as Anand
Vennela Kishore as Kishore
Satyam Rajesh as Rajesh
Vijay Sai as Banti
Noel Sean as Sheshi 
Srinivasa Reddy as Reliance worker
Shankar Melkote as Honey's boss
Raghu Babu as Police officer
Giri Babu as Police officer
Ravi Prakash as Investigating officer
 Harsha as Private detective

Production 
The director, a NRI, previously produced Andaru Dongale Dorikite (2004). Vennela Kishore learned about the role through his friend Ravi Varma. The film was shot in Hyderabad.

Soundtrack 
The music was composed by Mantra Anand.

Reception 
A critic from Idlebrain.com wrote that "Indumathi is a kind of film that is made with the purpose of entertainment by leaving the basic plot aside". A critic from Full Hyderabad wrote that "Indumathi is a disaster from the word go". A critic form Indiaglitz wrote that "Though there are a few pits in the story and screenplay department, Indumathi undisputedly has the potential to thrill audiences".

References